This is a list of seasons completed by the Illinois Fighting Illini football program since the team's conception in 1890. The list documents season-by-season records, and conference records from 1896 to the present.

Seasons

1Parke H. Davis awarded national championship to Illinois.
2 Billingsley, Boand, Football Research, and Parke H. Davis awarded national championship to Illinois.
3 Boand, Football Research, Helms, National Championship Foundation, and Parke H. Davis awarded national championship to Illinois.
4 Billingsley, Dickinson, Helms, National Championship Foundation, and Parke H. Davis awarded national championship to Illinois.
5 Boand awarded national championship to Illinois.

References

Illinois Fighting Illini
Illinois Fighting Illini football seasons